Knut von Kühlmann-Stumm  (born October 17 1916 in Munich; died January 19 1977 in Bad Soden-Salmünster), was a German politician for the Free Democtratic Party.

Life 

Kühlmann was the son of German entrepreneur and industrialist Richard von Kühlmann (1873–1948) and Margarete Freiin von Stumm (1884–1917). He attended school at Schloss Salem. After school he worked for a bank in Berlin. From 1936 to 1945 he served in the German Wehrmacht. After World War II he ran his own farm in Ramholz. He inherited a share of family mining company Gebrüder Stumm in Neunkirchen, Saarland. 

From 1956 to 1972 Kühlmann was member of the German FDP. From 1960 he was member of German Bundestag. During the period of the Kiesinger cabinet, Kühlmann-Stumm served as opposition leader from 1966 to 1968. He left the FDP because of its support for the Ostpolitik of chancellor Willy Brandt, joining the conservative CDU instead.

Kühlmann  married  Jutta von Stumm, and they had a son Magnus von Kühlmann-Stumm. He died in a car accident on 19 January  1977 in Bad Soden-Salmünster.

Awards 
 1968: Order of Merit of the Federal Republic of Germany

References 

Members of the Bundestag for the Free Democratic Party (Germany)
Members of the Bundestag for the Christian Democratic Union of Germany
Members of the Bundestag 1976–1980
Members of the Bundestag 1972–1976
Members of the Bundestag 1969–1972
Members of the Bundestag 1965–1969
Members of the Bundestag 1961–1965
Members of the Bundestag 1957–1961
Members of the Bundestag for Hesse
Barons of Germany
Alumni of Schule Schloss Salem
1916 births
1977 deaths
Grand Crosses with Star and Sash of the Order of Merit of the Federal Republic of Germany